Jipson Butukondolo is a composer, vocalist, and entertainer in the band Quartier Latin International. The band is from the Democratic Republic of the Congo and was founded and is led by Congolese musician Koffi Olomide. de 1998 a 2008

Overview
Some of the hits that Butukondolo participated in, in a leading role, include Ba Lobiens  and Biblia.

See also
Fally Ipupa
Bouro Mpela
List of Democratic Republic of the Congo musicians

References

Date of birth missing (living people)
Living people
People from Kinshasa
Soukous musicians
Quartier Latin International
20th-century Democratic Republic of the Congo male singers
Democratic Republic of the Congo songwriters
21st-century Democratic Republic of the Congo male singers
Year of birth missing (living people)